Sanaullah Bhat (14 November 1922 – 25 November 2009), also known as Khawaja Sonaullah Bhat, was an Indian journalist, author and columnist who wrote in Urdu. He was the founding editor of the Daily Aftab, a newspaper in Jammu and Kashmir. He is considered to be the father of the press in Kashmir. He wrote several books, including Ahd nāmah-yi Kashmīr.

Life and career
Sanaullah Bhat was born on 14 November 1922. His journalism career began in 1953 when he founded a weekly newspaper named Kashmir that was published from Muzaffarabad, Azad Kashmir.

In 1957, Bhat began publishing Aftab, a daily Urdu newspaper, and was its editor for over 40 years. He contributed the column Khazar Sochta Hai Wular Ke Kinare to the newspaper. The Aftab was registered with the Indian Registrar of Newspapers in 1965. The role of Aftab in Kashmiri journalism has been called exceptional.

Bhat is thought to be the first to use offset printing for a newspaper in Jammu and Kashmir. The Indian Express credits him with bringing photo journalism to the state. He has been described as the "father of journalism" in Kashmir. On the thirteenth anniversary of his death, Farooq Abdullah called him a devoted objective journalist and "the one who introduced street sale of newspapers" there. Omar Abdullah, a former Chief Minister of Jammu and Kashmir, described him as a pioneer of journalism in Kashmir. According to Shabir Shah, the founder of Jammu and Kashmir Democratic Freedom Party, analysing the Kashmir politics and presenting "it in the backdrop of subcontinent" was Bhat's routine affair work. 

In 1975, Bhat was elected the first president of Kashmir Press Club. He died on 25 November 2009 at Sher-i-Kashmir Institute of Medical Sciences, in Soura, Srinagar.

Publications
Bhat's works include:
 
 ʻAhd nāmah-yi Kashmīr

References

Further
 The founder of "Aftab", Khwajah Saheb

1922 births
2009 deaths
Kashmiri Muslims
Indian journalists
Urdu-language columnists